The 2017–18 West Bank Premier League is the 15th season of the top football league in the West Bank of Palestine.

League table

See also
2017–18 Gaza Strip Premier League
2017–18 Palestine Cup

References

External links
Palestina 2017/18 Professional League (West Bank), RSSSF.com

West Bank Premier League seasons
1
West